Henri Andréani (1877–1936) was a French film director of the silent era.

Selected filmography
  (1910)
 Jael and Sisera (1911)
 The Five Cents of Lavarede (1913)

References

Bibliography
 Goble, Alan. The Complete Index to Literary Sources in Film. Walter de Gruyter, 1999.

External links

1877 births
1936 deaths
French film directors